Streptomyces rubidus is an acidophilic bacterium species from the genus of Streptomyces which has been isolated from soil from a pine forest in Yanglin in the Yunnan province in China.

See also 
 List of Streptomyces species

References

Further reading

External links
Type strain of Streptomyces rubidus at BacDive -  the Bacterial Diversity Metadatabase

rubidus
Bacteria described in 2006